Kenneth Marine Kercheval (July 15, 1935 – April 21, 2019) was an American actor, best known for his role as Cliff Barnes on the television series Dallas and its 2012 revival.

Early life
Kercheval was born on July 15, 1935, in Wolcottville, Indiana, to Marine "Doc" Kercheval (1899-1967), a local physician, and the former Christine Reiber (1903-1996), a registered nurse. He was raised in Clinton, Indiana. As a teenager, Kercheval often was with his dad in the operating room and once put two stitches in his sister Kate when she had an appendectomy. Kercheval attended Indiana University, not to become a doctor, but to major in music and drama. He later studied at the University of the Pacific, and starting in 1956, at the Neighborhood Playhouse in New York City under Sanford Meisner.

Career
Kercheval made his Broadway debut in the 1962 play Something About a Soldier. He appeared off-Broadway in the 1972 Kurt Weill revue Berlin to Broadway with Kurt Weill, and can be heard on the cast recording. His other theatre credits included The Apple Tree, Cabaret (replacing Bert Convy as Cliff), and Here's Where I Belong. In 1966, he appeared as the title character in the original Broadway production of Fiddler on the Roof, co-starring with Herschel Bernardi, Maria Karnilova, Julia Migenes, Leonard Frey, and Pia Zadora.

Kercheval gained his first television role, playing the part of Dr. Nick Hunter number one on Search for Tomorrow in 1966. His later soap-opera roles were in The Secret Storm and How to Survive a Marriage.  His film credits include The Seven-Ups with Roy Scheider and Tony LoBianco plus F.I.S.T. with Sylvester Stallone. In 1976, he co-starred in two episodes of The Adams Chronicles as James Madison.

Kercheval is best known for having played J.R.'s nemesis Cliff Barnes on the CBS television series Dallas. He starred in the show from 1978 to 1991, from its pilot episode to the series finale. He initially was cast as Ray Krebbs before being given the role of Cliff Barnes. Kercheval and Larry Hagman were the only Dallas cast members to stay with the series throughout its entire run, although Kercheval's character was only a recurring character during the first two seasons. He became a regular cast member in the 1979–1980 season. Kercheval reprised the role of Cliff Barnes in the 1996 Dallas reunion, J. R. Returns, and he appeared in the 2004 CBS reunion special. He again reprised the role in the Dallas (2012) series.

In the 1980s, he made numerous appearances on  Super Password and The $25,000 Pyramid. In 1991, he appeared in the reunion movie, I Still Dream of Jeannie, playing Mr. Simpson, a guidance counselor at Anthony Nelson Jr.'s high school and was the temporary master for Anthony Jr.'s mother, Jeannie (Barbara Eden); this was because Larry Hagman, who played Tony Nelson, was not available to reprise his role, as he had not yet finished his run on Dallas – the irony being that I Dream of Jeannie was Hagman's first major series, and the actors' respective Dallas characters despised each other. He also appeared as a ballroom dance teacher in the independent film California Casanova.

In 2006, Kercheval appeared in the musical White Christmas at Southampton's Mayflower Theatre and Plymouth's Theatre Royal as the General. In 2007, he reprised his role at the Edinburgh Playhouse and the Wales Millennium Centre in Cardiff. He reprised his role in Sunderland in 2010 and at The Lowry in Salford Quay with Coronation Street actor Wendi Peters and Brookside regular Claire Sweeney from November 2012 until January 2013.

In 1985, Kercheval became a partner in the Old Capital Popcorn Company. The business thrived at first, but the partnership soured in 1988. The financial issues and other conflicts led to a 1989 armed rampage and suicide on the Dallas set by one of the partners.

Personal life and death
A lifelong smoker, Kercheval was a lung cancer survivor after having had part of his lung removed in 1994. Kercheval was married and divorced three times and had five children. , he had six grandchildren. 

Kercheval died of pneumonia on April 21, 2019, at the age of 83.

Filmography

Naked City (1962, TV Series) as Acting Student (uncredited)
The Defenders (1962–1965, TV Series) as Harry Grant / Jack Wilks
The Nurses (1965, TV Series) as Mac
The Trials of O'Brien (1965–1966, TV Series) as Jerry Quinlan / Dr. McCahey
Hawk (1966, TV Series) as Clark
An Enemy of the People (1966, TV Movie) as Billing
Pretty Poison (1968) as Harry Jackson
The Secret Storm (1968, TV series regular) as Archie Borman
Cover Me Babe (1970) as Jerry
Rabbit, Run (1970) as Barney
The Coming Asunder of Jimmy Bright (1971, TV Movie) as Jimmy Bright
Search for Tomorrow (1965-1973, TV series regular) as Dr. Nick Hunter
The Seven-Ups (1973) as Ansel – Seven-Up
Get Christie Love! (1974, TV Series) as Alec Palmer
The Disappearance of Flight 412 (1974, TV Movie) as White
How to Survive a Marriage (1974, TV series regular) as Larry Kirby
Beacon Hill (1975, TV Series) as Dist. Attorney
The Adams Chronicles (1976, TV Series) as James Madison
Judge Horton and the Scottsboro Boys (1976, TV Movie) as District Attorney Tom Knight
Network (1976) as Merrill Grant
The Lincoln Conspiracy (1977) as John Surratt
Rafferty (1977, TV Series) as Jerry Parks
Family (1978, TV Series) as Mark Adams
Kojak (1973–1978, TV Series) as Teddy Maclay / Professor Lacey / Ray Fromm
F.I.S.T (1978) as Bernie Marr
Devil Dog: The Hound of Hell (1978, TV Movie) as Miles Amory 
CHiPs (1978, TV Series) as Dr. Faraday
Too Far to Go (1979, TV Movie) as Jack Dennis
Starsky & Hutch (1979, TV Series) as Deputy D.A. Clayburn
Walking Through the Fire (1979, TV Movie) as Dr. Freeman
Here's Boomer (1980, TV Series) as Dr. Haggert
Trapper John, M.D. (1981, TV Series) as Marty Wicks
The Patricia Neal Story (1981, TV Movie) as Dr. Charles Canton
The Demon Murder Case (1983, TV Movie) as Richard Clarion
Calamity Jane (1984, TV Movie) as Buffalo Bill Cody
The Love Boat (1981–1984, TV Series) as Lester Erwin / Don Bartlett
Glitter (1985, TV Series) as John Ramsey Jr.
Hotel (1983–1986, TV Series) as Frank Jessup / Leo Cooney
You Are the Jury (1986, TV Series) as Stanley Nelson
Mike Hammer (1987, TV Series) as A. Walter Decker
Matlock (1987, TV Series) as Louis Devlin
Highway to Heaven (1988, TV Series) as Richard Osbourne
Perry Mason: The Case of the Defiant Daughter (1990, TV Movie) as L.D. Ryan 
Corporate Affairs (1990) as Arthur Strickland 
Dallas (1978–1991, TV series regular) as Cliff Barnes
California Casanova (1991) as Willie
Keeping Secrets (1991, TV Movie) as Frank Mahoney
I Still Dream of Jeannie (1991, TV Movie) as Mr. Simpson
Diagnosis: Murder: Diagnosis of Murder (1992, TV Movie) as Frank Stevens
L.A. Law (1992, TV Series) as Al Bremmer
Murder, She Wrote (1992, TV Series) as Alex Ericson
Dangerous Curves (1992, TV Series) as Jimmy Douglas
In the Heat of the Night (1993, TV Series) as Judge Lawton Gray
Woman on the Ledge (1993, TV Movie) as Doctor Martin
The Golden Palace (1993, TV Series) as Charlie
Beretta's Island (1994) as Barone
Walker, Texas Ranger (1993, TV Series) as Dr. Slade
Lovejoy (1993, TV Series) as Rutherford Lovejoy
Burke's Law (1994, TV Series) as Bernie Green
A Perry Mason Mystery: The Case of the Grimacing Governor (1994, TV Movie) as Harlan Richards
Dallas: J.R. Returns (1996, TV Movie) as Cliff Barnes
Rusty: A Dog's Tale (1998) as Carl Winthrope
ER (1 episode, 1998) as Mr. Zwicki
Diagnosis: Murder (1993–2000, TV Series) as Keith Dunn / Duke Fallon / William P. Bissell / Alex Ridlin
Blind Obsession (2001) as Harrison Pendragon
Crossing Jordan (2002–2006, TV Series) as Claude Manning
Corrado (2009) as Vittorio
Dallas (2012–2014, TV Series, recurring role) as Cliff Barnes
The Promise (2017) as Dr. Christopher Webber
Surviving in L.A. (2019) as Charlie (final film role)

References

External links

 
 
 
 
 

1935 births
2019 deaths
American male television actors
American male soap opera actors
American male stage actors
American male film actors
Deaths from pneumonia in Indiana
Male actors from Indiana
20th-century American male actors
21st-century American male actors
American collectors
People from LaGrange County, Indiana
People from Clinton, Indiana
American people of German descent